Sergei Flerko (Сергей Флерко, born  in Tula) is a Russian male weightlifter, competing in the +105 kg category and representing Russia at international competitions. He participated at the 1996 Summer Olympics in the 108 kg event. He competed at world championships, most recently at the 1999 World Weightlifting Championships.

Major results
 - 1995 World Championships Heavyweight class (405.0 kg)
 - 1995 European Championships Heavyweight class (400.0 kg)

References

External links
 

1972 births
Living people
Russian male weightlifters
Weightlifters at the 1996 Summer Olympics
Olympic weightlifters of Russia
Sportspeople from Tula, Russia
World Weightlifting Championships medalists
20th-century Russian people
21st-century Russian people